Trailers from Hell (branded as Trailers from Hell!) is a web series in which filmmakers discuss and promote individual movies through commenting on their trailers. While the series emphasizes horror, science fiction, fantasy, cult, and exploitation cinema, films from a wide variety of genres have been covered. Trailers from Hell launched as a website in October 2007, as a collaborative project by film director Joe Dante, new media entrepreneur Jonas Hudson, graphic artist Charlie Largent, web developer Tom Edgar, and producer Elizabeth Stanley. It also premiered at SXSW in 2009.

Commentary
Each trailer features commentary on the art, craft, and history of filmmaking, regarding both the trailer itself and the film it represents. Regular Trailers from Hell commentators, referred to as "gurus" on the series website, include (in addition to Joe Dante) John Landis, Guillermo del Toro, Roger Corman, and Eli Roth. Film editor and critic Glenn Erickson writes, "The host commentaries provide the real added value, cramming a wealth of information, humor and insights into the two- to four- minute trailer running times."

Some of the trailers he cut early in his career for low-budget filmmaker Roger Corman's New World Pictures have been called the "best trailers for less-than stellar movies you've ever seen". Dante was also able to augment his collection with many additional previews for classic and "not so classic" horror films during his time at Corman's studio. 

The previously mentioned Erickson has referred to Trailers from Hell as "one of the brightest web destinations for fantastic film fans...." while the horror and suspense genre journal Cinefantastique called it "fabulous". American Movie Classics has lauded Dante for being "appreciative of and well-versed in the history of the exploitation cinema" through his work on Trailers from Hell.

Home video
There have been two compilations of Trailers from Hell that have been released on DVD so far. Volume 1 was released in 2010 and Volume 2 was released by Shout! Factory on July 5, 2011.

List of commentators

 Guillermo del Toro
 Fede Álvarez
 Allison Anders
 Allan Arkush
 John Badham
 Rick Baker
 Jessica Bendinger
 Darren Bousman
 Axelle Carolyn
 Larry Cohen
 Julie Corman
 Roger Corman
 Don Coscarelli
 Joe Dante
 Jon Davison
 David DeCoteau
 David Del Valle
 Ernest Dickerson
 Illeana Douglas
 Bill Duke
 Mick Garris
 Mark Goldblatt
 Stuart Gordon
 Dana Gould
 Sam Hamm
 Marshall Harvey
 Mark Helfrich
 George Hickenlooper
 Jack Hill
 Heidi Honeycutt
 Gillian Horvat
 Tim Hunter
 Dan Ireland
 Kier-La Janisse
 Jonathan Kaplan
 Larry Karaszewski
 Lloyd Kaufman
 Daniel Kremer
 Karyn Kusama
 Neil Labute
 Mary Lambert
 John Landis
 Max Landis
 Quentin Lee
 Dennis Lehane
 Michael Lehmann
 J.D. Lifshitz
 Rod Lurie
 William Malone
 Neil Marshall
 Ib Melchior
 Mike Mendez
 Ed Neumeier
 Josh Olson
 Oren Peli
 Mark Pellington
 Dan Perri
 Michael Peyser
 Adam Rifkin
 Howard Rodman
 Eduardo Rodriguez
 Eli Roth
 John Sayles
 Michael Schlesinger
 Steve Senski
 Katt Shea
 Alan Spencer
 Michael Tolkin
 Brian Trenchard-Smith
 Jesus Trevino
 Robert Weide
 Ti West
 Christopher Wilkinson
 Edgar Wright
 David Zeiger

References

External links
 
 Trailers from Hell at IMDb
 Official YouTube channel

American film websites
Internet properties established in 2007
Film and video fandom
Cult following
Horror fandom
Science fiction fandom
Fantasy fandom